Malcolm Bell may refer to:
 Malcolm Bell (cricketer) (born 1969), English cricketer
 Malcolm Bell (entrepreneur) (born 1981), British businessman